The Mayor Edwin O. Childs House is a historic house at 340 California Street in Newton, Massachusetts.  It is a stucco-clad two story wood-frame structure with a side gable roof and a three-bay shed-roof dormer.  The centered entrance is sheltered by a square portico supported by paired square columns and topped by a balustrade. The house was built in 1915 to a design by Brainerd and Leeds for Edwin O. Childs, who was then serving as Newton's mayor.  The house is a well-preserved example of the Craftsman style.

The house was listed on the National Register of Historic Places in 1990.

See also
 National Register of Historic Places listings in Newton, Massachusetts

References

Houses on the National Register of Historic Places in Newton, Massachusetts
Houses completed in 1915